Studio Filmów Rysunkowych (Animated Film Studio) is a Polish animation studio based in Bielsko-Biała. It is best known for animating Polish cartoons of Bolek and Lolek and Reksio.

It was founded in 1947 by brothers Zdzisław and Maciej Lachur with Władysław Nehrebecki, Leszek Lorek, Alfred Ledwig, Mieczysław Poznański, Aleksander Rohoziński, Wiktor Sakowicz, Rufin Struzik, and Wacław Wajser. In 1948, the studio moved to Wisła, and then to Bielsko.

Productions

Animated Series 
 Bolek and Lolek (1963–1986)
 Reksio (1967–1990)
 Balthazar the Dragon (1960s-????)
 Margo the Mouse (1976–1983)
 Kuba and Sruba ((2011–2016)

References

External links
 

1947 establishments in Poland
Mass media companies established in 1947
Polish animation studios
Bielsko-Biała